"Feel Like Makin' Love" is a song composed by singer-songwriter and producer Eugene McDaniels, and recorded originally by soul singer-songwriter Roberta Flack. The song has been covered by  R&B and jazz artists including Gladys Knight and the Pips, Lou Rawls, Isaac Hays, George Benson, Larry Coryell, Johnny Mathis, Marlena Shaw, and George Benson.

Reception
Released nine months before the album of the same title, the song became one of the greatest musical successes of 1974, as well as of Roberta Flack's recording career. Flack's version scored a week at number 1 on the Billboard Hot 100 singles chart, making it Flack's third #1 single, making her the first female vocalist since 1940 to top the chart in three consecutive years. "Feel Like Makin' Love" also had five weeks at #1 on the Hot Soul Singles chart. and two weeks at #1 on the Adult Contemporary charts of both Canada and the U.S. Flack co-produced the record under the pseudonym Rubina Flake, with Eugene McDaniels. It went on to receive three Grammy nominations for Flack: Record of the Year, Song of the Year, and Best Female Pop Vocal Performance.

Upon the single release, Record World said that it "isn't as poetic as 'Killing Me Softly,' but what Roberta brings to it will make this her biggest record since."

Chart performance

Weekly charts

Year-end charts

D'Angelo version

"Feel Like Makin' Love" was covered by American R&B and neo soul musician D'Angelo for his second studio album Voodoo (2000). It was released April 8, 2000, on Virgin Records as the album's fifth and last single. His cover version features a quiet storm radio-style sound and heavy use of multi-tracking for vocals. It was initially planned as a duet with R&B singer Lauryn Hill. Although tapes were sent via FedEx between the two, the collaboration between D'Angelo and Hill was aborted and the song was instead recorded solo. According to producer and drummer Questlove, the duet failed to materialize due to "too many middle men.... I don't think Lauryn and D ever talked face-to-face." Mistakenly, some critics who later reviewed the album's track assumed that Lauryn Hill's vocals are present in the recording.

According to Questlove's review of Voodoo at Okayplayer, the song's production was also managed by late hip hop producer J Dilla, as Questlove stated "Jay Dee did the Lauryn track". Dilla, however, did not receive an official credit for the song. As a single, "Feel Like Makin' Love" was Voodoos least successful, as it only reached #109 on the Billboard Hot R&B/Hip-Hop Singles & Tracks chart.

Chart performance

Other versions
The song has been covered by many artists. Among the most notable are:
An instrumental version by Bob James for his 1974 album One,  reaching #88 on the Hot 100. This version was later used in the Breaking Bad episode "Bit by a Dead Bee". 
An Estonian-language version by Velly Joonas, "Käes on aeg", was recorded in 1980, but did not gain mass popularity until it was re-released in 2015.
A version by George Benson for his 1983 album In Your Eyes, reaching #28 in the United Kingdom and #18 in Ireland.
Lumidee covered it in her 2007 album, Unexpected, and released it as a single, peaking at #90 on the Hot 100.
Celeste Legaspi covered it in 1976 with her song "Pag-ibig Na Lubos Lubos."

See also
List of RPM number-one singles of 1974
List of Hot 100 number-one singles of 1974 (U.S.)
List of number-one R&B singles of 1974 (U.S.)
List of number-one adult contemporary singles of 1974 (U.S.)

Notes

References

External links
Feel Like Making Love by D'Angelo on Yahoo! Music
 

1974 singles
Roberta Flack songs
D'Angelo songs
Lumidee songs
Nancy Wilson (jazz singer) songs
Billboard Hot 100 number-one singles
Cashbox number-one singles
RPM Top Singles number-one singles
1974 songs
Atlantic Records singles
Virgin Records singles
Songs written by Gene McDaniels